St. Joseph's Church, Jinan, locally known as St. Joseph's Church, Chenjialou,  is an early 20th-century Gothic Catholic church in Tianqiao District of Jinan, Shandong, China.

History 
The St. Joseph's Church was originally built in 1660 and was the second Catholic church in Jinan, Shandong, after the Church of the Immaculate Conception, Jinan. In 1907, Franciscan Italian priest rebuilt the church in Chenjialou with a Gothic architecture style.

In 2007, it was inscribed as a municipal cultural relic preservation organ by the Jinan government.

References 

Roman Catholic churches completed in 1907
Churches in Shandong
Tourist attractions in Jinan
1907 establishments in China
20th-century Roman Catholic church buildings in China